Arthur Gustavo Malzahn III (born October 28, 1965) is an American football coach. He is currently the head coach at the University of Central Florida (UCF). He was the head football coach at Auburn University from 2013 to 2020. As an offensive coordinator he helped lead the 2010 Auburn Tigers to a National Championship. As head coach at Auburn, he led the team to a SEC Championship and an appearance in the 2014 BCS National Championship Game. Malzahn has coached Heisman winner Cam Newton and three Heisman finalists: Tre Mason, Nick Marshall, and Cameron Artis-Payne. During Malzahn’s tenure at Auburn, he qualified as the second-longest tenured head coach at one school in the SEC, behind Nick Saban.

Prior to his stints at Arkansas State and Auburn, Malzahn was the offensive coordinator at the University of Arkansas and the University of Tulsa. He became the head coach at Arkansas State University after his success as offensive coordinator at Auburn from (2009–2011). As a first-year head coach, he led his team to finish as the 2012 Sun Belt Champions. He returned to Auburn in 2013 as head coach, Malzahn received national attention for coaching one of the biggest turnarounds in college football history at Auburn. Malzahn inherited an Auburn Tigers football team that did not win a single Southeastern Conference game in the 2012 season, then led them to an SEC Championship and an appearance in the 2014 BCS Championship Game. The Tigers won their eighth SEC title and tallied a record of 12–2 (7–1 in SEC play) only a year after what was considered by many to be their worst season in 60 years. For his accomplishments, Malzahn received several "coach of the year" awards including the 2013 SEC Coach of the Year, Home Depot Coach of the Year, Sporting News Coach of the Year, Eddie Robinson Coach of the Year, Bobby Bowden Coach of the Year Award, Paul "Bear" Bryant Award, and the AP College Football Coach of the Year Award.

Playing career
Malzahn graduated from Fort Smith Christian High School in Fort Smith, Arkansas in 1984 and was a walk-on receiver at Arkansas under then-head coach Ken Hatfield in 1984 and 1985 before transferring to Henderson State University located in Arkadelphia, Arkansas, where he was a two-year letterman (1988, 1989) and earned his bachelor's degree in physical education in 1990.

High school coaching career
Malzahn got his start as the defensive coordinator at Hughes High School in Hughes, Arkansas in 1991. He became head coach in 1992 and in 1994 Hughes reached the state championship game with an upset of Pine Bluff Dollarway. Hughes fell just short in the title game, losing to Lonoke High School on an interception in the final minute.

Malzahn's success at Hughes and his wide-open attack landed him a head coaching position at Shiloh Christian School in 1996. From 1996 to 2000, he transformed Shiloh Christian into one of the most dynamic offensive prep squads in the nation. In 1998, Shiloh Christian set a national record with 66 passing touchdowns for the season, while quarterback Josh Floyd nearly set an individual national record with 5,878 total yards (5,221 passing, 657 rushing). Malzahn guided the Saints to back-to-back state championships in 1998 and 1999.

In 2001, Malzahn took over for long-time coach Jarrell Williams at Springdale High School. Malzahn continued the rich tradition of the Bulldogs’ program. He led the program to two state championship game appearances in his last four years, winning the title in 2005.

Malzahn led his squad to the state title game in only his second season in 2002. The Bulldogs lost 17–10 to Fort Smith Southside.

Springdale was on track for another state title game appearance in 2004 before Little Rock Central sidetracked the Bulldogs’ title hopes in the state semifinals. Springdale was upset by the eventual state champion, 31–20. The Bulldogs finished the season at 12–1.

Malzahn's 2005 squad at Springdale went 14–0, easily won the state’s Class AAAAA championship, outscored its opponents 664–118, including a 54–20 victory over West Memphis in the state championship game, and was consistently ranked among the top 10 teams in the nation.

Included on the championship team were prize recruits Mitch Mustain, Ben Cleveland, Andrew Norman, and Damian Williams who all eventually joined Malzahn at the University of Arkansas. Offensive tackle Bartley Webb decided to leave the state to play for the University of Notre Dame.

In 2013, Malzahn was inducted into the Arkansas High School Coaches Association's Hall of Fame.

College coaching career

As offensive coordinator

Arkansas
Malzahn joined Houston Nutt's staff on December 9, 2005, as offensive coordinator and wide receivers coach, following an impressive five-year run at Springdale High School capped by one of the most dominant seasons by any high school in 2005. Given that much of Springdale High's football talent decided to follow Malzahn to Arkansas and the fact that Malzahn had never coached in college, many questioned what Houston Nutt's motives were. Malzahn was part of the Razorbacks 2006 season in which they won the SEC Western Division championship. However, their season ended with three straight losses to LSU, Florida in the SEC Championship Game, and Wisconsin in the Capital One Bowl to finish with a 10–4 record.

There was a widely reported tension between Houston Nutt's reliance on the ground game (which turned out to be one of the best running games in the nation in 2006) and Malzahn's philosophy of spreading the field with a no-huddle offense. The poor ending of the season only added stress to the already tense coaching relationship. Malzahn was named the National Offensive Coordinator of the Year by Rivals.com.

Despite this tension, the 2006 season served as a breakout for running backs Darren McFadden (1,647 yards with 14 TD) and Felix Jones (1,168 yards with 6 TD). Wide receiver Marcus Monk had 962 yards receiving with 11 touchdowns despite catching passes from two quarterbacks.

In January 2007, Malzahn received an offer from the University of Tulsa and his friend, new head coach Todd Graham. He took the Tulsa job to be offensive coordinator and assistant head coach. Shortly after, both Mustain and Williams decided to transfer to the University of Southern California.

Tulsa
During the 2007 season, Malzahn emerged as one of the premier offensive coordinators in the nation, as Tulsa ranked first in the nation in total yards per game, ahead of Texas Tech and Hawaii, and with a more balanced attack than both teams. The Golden Hurricane also ranked 3rd in the nation in passing and led their conference in scoring. Tulsa became the first team in NCAA history to have a 5,000-yard passer, a 1,000-yard rusher and three 1,000-yard receivers in a single season.

After the regular season, Malzahn interviewed for the open position at Arkansas once Nutt resigned in November 2007.

In 2008, Tulsa was once again the nation's most prolific attack, leading with nearly 7,980 total yards of offense averaging 570 yards per game. The Golden Hurricane were ranked second in the nation in scoring behind Oklahoma, scoring over 47 points per game. Tulsa not only ranked second in the nation in scoring that year, but finished with the second highest scoring offense in the history of major college football. The offense was also the nation's most balanced attack, ranking fifth in the nation in rushing and 9th in passing. The Tulsa quarterbacks finished third in the nation in passing efficiency, behind only Oklahoma and Texas.

Auburn
Malzahn was named the offensive coordinator at Auburn University by first year head coach Gene Chizik on December 28, 2008. Under Malzahn, Auburn made significant improvements over the previous season's offensive production; the Tigers finished the season ranked 16th in total offense (2nd in the SEC against all opponents) with just under 432 yards per game and 17th in scoring with over 33 points per game after being tied for 110th in the nation in scoring the previous season. Although he still made significant improvements in his first year, against SEC competition Auburn managed 377.1 total yards a game which placed them 4th in the SEC (behind Alabama, Arkansas, and Ole Miss). His first season broke the Auburn single season total offense record previously set by the undefeated 2004 team. Head coach Gene Chizik had stressed prior to the season that he intended to focus on the run game which showed great improvement as well; the rushing offense finished the season ranked 13th in the nation with 212 yards per game after being ranked 69th prior to the new coaching staff's arrival. Passing numbers also improved under the new offensive scheme, with the passing efficiency ranking ending up 22nd nationally after being ranked 106th in 2008. Senior quarterback Chris Todd set a single-season touchdown record at Auburn and finished the season with a passer rating of 145.73, ranking him 18th in the nation. During the 2009 season, Auburn's offense under Malzahn, produced 120 plays of 15 yards or more, nearly doubling the 62 compiled in 2008.

In 2010, Malzahn's offense, led by Heisman Trophy winner Cam Newton at quarterback, helped Auburn achieve an undefeated record, a No. 1 national ranking after the regular season and a berth in the BCS Championship game, played on January 10, 2011. Auburn led the SEC in scoring offense, total offense, rushing offense, pass efficiency, first downs and third down conversions on its way to a 13–0 record and a 56–17 victory over South Carolina in the SEC Championship Game. Malzahn was awarded the 2010 Broyles Award, recognizing him as the top assistant coach in the nation. Auburn went on to win the 2011 BCS National Championship Game against Oregon.

In 2011, ESPN selected Malzahn as one of the best recruiters in the Southeastern Conference.

As head coach

Arkansas State
On December 13, 2011, Malzahn left Auburn to accept the position of head football coach at Arkansas State University. In his first and only year at Arkansas State, Malzahn led the team to a 9–3 record (not including the Bowl Game) and a Conference Championship with a win over Middle Tennessee State, 45–0. One of Malzahn's players, Don Jones, was selected by the Miami Dolphins in the seventh round of the 2013 draft and made the team as a safety.

Quarterback Ryan Aplin showcased Malzahn's evolving spread dual attack by throwing for 3,342 yards with 24 TD and running for 438 yards with 6 more TD. RB David Oku would add 1,061 yards with 16 TD and WR J. D. McKissic had 103 catches for 1,022 yards with five touchdowns.

Auburn
As previous head coach Gene Chizik gets fired, Malzahn is chosen to be the new head coach at Auburn. In the 2013 Iron Bowl, Auburn  defeated Alabama when a short field goal attempt by Alabama was returned by Auburn's Chris Davis from the end zone for a 109-yd touchdown (known as the Kick Six game) as Auburn won 34-28.

Three years later in 2016, Auburn starts off 1-2. Somehow, in the following week, Auburn beat LSU 18-13 due to LSU not snapping the ball before the game clock ran out. 

In 2018, Auburn starts off undefeated but then loses to LSU.

In 2019, Malzahn and Auburn start undefeated, but got upset by #10 Florida Gators. Auburn is 6-1, but loses 23-20 to LSU and #4 Georgia Bulldogs. However, Auburn defeats #5 Alabama 48-45. 

In 2020, Gus Malzahn went 6-4 and was released in December.

UCF
On February 15, 2021, Malzahn was named the head coach at UCF, reuniting him with former Arkansas State athletic director Terry Mohajir. On September 2, Malzahn won his first game with the Knights, defeating Boise State, 36–31. Malzahn concluded the regular season going 8–4. He led the Knights to a 29–17 victory over in state rival Florida in the Gasparilla Bowl, going for a 9–4 overall in his first season with UCF.

Offensive philosophy
One of the most innovative offensive minds in football, Malzahn's is known for his hurry-up, no-huddle offensive philosophy. In January 2003, he published a book and instructional video titled Hurry Up No Huddle – An Offensive Philosophy. Majority of college football programs have adopted his no huddle, up tempo offensive philosophy. Several National Football League teams adopted some of Malzahn's offensive strategies.

Coaching tree
Malzahn is from the Houston Nutt coaching tree. It was a huge risk for Coach Nutt, as Malzahn, although one of the most dominant high school coaches, had never coached at the college level. However, Malzahn quickly became one of the winningest coaches and most known for his uptempo offenses. Malzahn's coaching career also encompasses working alongside Gene Chizik, having worked as his offensive coordinator and quarterbacks coach at Auburn when they won the 2011 BCS National Championship.

Coaches under Malzahn that became head coaches:
 Mike Norvell: Memphis (2016–2019), Florida State (2020–present)
 Brent Dearmon: Bethel (TN) (2018), North Alabama (2023–present)
 Chip Lindsey: Troy (2019–2021)
 Jake Spavital: Texas State (2019–2022)
 Eliah Drinkwitz: Appalachian State (2019), Missouri (2020–present)
 Kenny Dillingham: Arizona State (2023–present)

Players under Malzahn that became head coaches:
 Rhett Lashlee: SMU (2022–present)
 G. J. Kinne: Incarnate Word (2022), Texas State (2023–present)

Head coaching record

* Did not coach bowl game 

* Did not coach bowl game

Published works
 The Hurry Up, No Huddle: An Offensive Philosophy (2003)

Personal life
Malzahn is married to the former Kristi Otwell, and they are the parents of two daughters.

References

Further reading

External links

 UCF profile

1965 births
Living people
American football wide receivers
Arkansas Razorbacks football coaches
Arkansas Razorbacks football players
Arkansas State Red Wolves football coaches
Auburn Tigers football coaches
Henderson State Reddies football players
Tulsa Golden Hurricane football coaches
UCF Knights football coaches
High school football coaches in Arkansas
People from Irving, Texas
People from Springdale, Arkansas
Sportspeople from the Dallas–Fort Worth metroplex
Sportspeople from Fort Smith, Arkansas
Coaches of American football from Arkansas
Players of American football from Arkansas